The name Olivia has been used for ten tropical cyclones in the Eastern Pacific Ocean.

 Hurricane Olivia (1967) – struck Baja California.
 Hurricane Olivia (1971) – continuation of Atlantic Hurricane Irene; hit Mexico.
 Hurricane Olivia (1975) – caused heavy damage in Mazatlán.
 Hurricane Olivia (1978) – continuation of Hurricane Greta; struck Mexico.
 Hurricane Olivia (1982) – brought rain to California.
 Hurricane Olivia (1994) – never threatened land.
 Tropical Storm Olivia (2000) – never threatened land.
 Tropical Storm Olivia (2006) – never threatened land.
 Tropical Storm Olivia (2012) – never threatened land.
 Hurricane Olivia (2018) – made landfall in Hawaii as a tropical storm.

The name Olivia has been used for one tropical cyclone in the Australian region. 
Cyclone Olivia (1996) – an intense cyclone that made landfall in western Australia. 

Pacific hurricane set index articles
Australian region cyclone set index articles